The Latarmá, Latarma or Arria river is a fluvial course in Cantabria, Spain. It is a tributary of the  Lamasón River and a subaffluent of the Nansa River, to whose river basin it belongs.

Geography
The headwaters begin at the macizo de Arria, in the Peña Rubia, and the first third of its route passes through Asturias. Until its confluence with the Lamasón, the Latarmá rotates between being submerged and visible. There are two important upwellings, one at the height of the Lafuente (339 msnm), and another next to Venta Fresnedo (180 msnm). The last cave in which to submerge is the cueva del Toyo, before joining with the Lamasón in Venta Fresnedo. Flowing in a west to east direction, its course is located in the partially karst valley that bears its name, in the town of Herrerías. The successive tributaries are named, beginning with the first one, Chorro Bucero, Arauco, Seguedal, La Huerta, Pozo del Agua and Nacimiento del Agua.

References

External links

Rivers of Cantabria
Rivers of Spain